Doris Martha Alice Crane (20 February 1911 – 16 March 1999) was a British sculptor who created figures and reliefs in both ivory and wood.

Biography
Crane was born in the Clapham area of London and studied under Willian Everatt Gray. She was a regular exhibitor at the Royal Academy in London, at the Royal Scottish Academy and at the Paris Salon. Crane became a member of the Royal Miniature Society in 1958. She was a member of the Deben Art Club and lived for many years at Old Felixstowe in Suffolk.

Further reading
 Dictionary of British Artists Working 1900–1950 by Grant M. Waters, 1975, Eastbourne Fine Art.

References

1911 births
1999 deaths
20th-century British sculptors
20th-century English women artists
English women sculptors
People from Clapham
Sculptors from London